The 1874 New Jersey gubernatorial election was held on November 3, 1874. Democratic nominee Joseph D. Bedle defeated Republican nominee George A. Halsey with 53.65% of the vote.

General election

Candidates
Joseph D. Bedle, Associate Justice of the New Jersey Supreme Court (Democratic)
George A. Halsey, former U.S. Representative from Newark (Republican)

Results

References

1874
New Jersey
Gubernatorial
November 1874 events